Fuji Food Products is a food manufacturer based in Santa Fe Springs, California, United States, that specializes in ready-to-eat sushi products for supermarkets in the United States. The company is owned by Meruelo Group which purchased it in 2009.

History 
In 1990, Fuji Food Products was established as a family business in San Diego, California and supplied sushi products for regional supermarkets. In 1998, Fuji Food Products provided their products to major supermarket chains. In 2017, their products are available in most states in the US.

With over 500 employees, Fuji Food Products is now the largest provider and distributor of pre-packaged Sushi in the United States. 

In April, 2011, Fuji Food Products acquired Okami, Inc., a manufacturer of ethnic meals.

In 2019, after a recall from Trader Joe's and other major markets Fuji Food Products closed their facility located in Brockton, MA. Following these events, Trader Joe's made another recall at there Santa Fe Springs, CA, which did not pass causing the cancellation of their contract.

References 

Food manufacturers of the United States
Food and drink companies based in California
Food and drink companies established in 1990
Sushi in the United States
Companies based in Los Angeles County, California
1990 establishments in California
2009 mergers and acquisitions
Santa Fe Springs, California
Family-owned companies